Converse County School District #1 is a public school district based in Douglas, Wyoming, United States.

Geography
Converse County School District #1 serves the eastern portion of Converse County, including the following communities:

Incorporated places
City of Douglas
Town of Lost Springs
Census-designated places (Note: All census-designated places are unincorporated.)
Esterbrook
Unincorporated places
Bill
Orin
Shawnee

Schools
Grades 9-12
Douglas High School
Grades 6-8
Douglas Middle School
Grades 3-5
Douglas Intermediate School
Grades K-2
Douglas Primary School
Grades K-8
Dry Creek Elementary School
Moss Agate Elementary School
Shawnee Elementary School
White Elementary School

Student demographics
The following figures are as of October 1, 2009.

Total District Enrollment: 1,677
Student enrollment by gender
Male: 858 (51.16%)
Female: 819 (48.84%)
Student enrollment by ethnicity
American Indian or Alaska Native: 11 (0.66%)
Asian: 7 (0.42%)
Black or African American: 11 (0.66%)
Hispanic or Latino: 118 (7.04%)
Native Hawaiian or Other Pacific Islander: 1 (0.06%)
Two or More Races: 4 (0.24%)
White: 1,525 (90.94%)

See also
List of school districts in Wyoming

References

External links
Converse County School District #1 – official site.

Education in Converse County, Wyoming
School districts in Wyoming
Douglas, Wyoming